The Resident Governor of the Tower of London and Keeper of the Jewel House is responsible for the day-to-day running of the Tower of London.

The Constable of the Tower is the most senior appointment at the Tower of London. Under the King's Regulations for the Army, the office of constable is conferred on a field marshal or retired general officer for a five-year term. At the conclusion of the Constable's installation ceremony, the Lord Chamberlain symbolically hands the palace over to the Constable. He in turn entrusts it to the Resident Governor.

The offices of Resident Governor of the Tower of London and Keeper of the Jewel House were amalgamated in 1967. The King's House located within the Tower of London is the home of the Resident Governor.

List of combined office holders
List of combined office holders:

1967: Colonel Sir Thomas Pierce Butler
1971: Major-General Sir Digby Raeburn
1979: Major-General Giles Mills
1984: Major-General Andrew Patrick Withy MacLellan
1989: Major-General Christopher Tyler
1994: Major-General Geoffrey Field
2006: Major-General Keith Cima
2011: Colonel Richard Harrold
2019: Brigadier Andrew Jackson

See also
Jewel House

References

Positions within the British Royal Household
Tower of London